Bún bò Huế (pronounced ) or bún bò is a popular Vietnamese rice noodle (bún) dish with sliced beef (bò), chả lụa, and sometimes pork knuckles. The dish originates from Huế, a city in central Vietnam associated with the cooking style of the former royal court. The dish has a mix of spicy, salty, and umami flavors. The predominant flavor is that of lemongrass. Compared to phở or bún riêu, the noodles are thicker and cylindrical.

Features
Outside the province of Thừa Thiên-Huế, it is called bún bò Huế to denote its origin. Within Huế and surrounding cities, it is known simply as bún bò. The broth is prepared by simmering beef bones and beef shank with lemongrass, and then seasoned with fermented shrimp sauce and sugar for taste. Spicy chili oil is added later during the cooking process.

Bún bò usually includes thin slices of marinated and boiled beef shank, chunks of oxtail, and pig's knuckles. 

Bún bò is commonly served with lime wedges, cilantro sprigs, diced green onions, raw sliced onions, chili sauce, thinly sliced banana blossom, red cabbage, mint, basil, perilla, Persicaria odorata or Vietnamese coriander (rau răm), saw tooth herb (ngò gai) and sometimes mung bean sprouts. Thinly sliced purple cabbage is sometimes used a substitute when banana blossoms are not available. Purple cabbage most resembles banana blossom in texture, though not in taste. Fish sauce and shrimp paste are added to the soup according to taste. Ingredients might be varied by region due to their availability.

References

Vietnamese soups
Culture in Huế
Vietnamese words and phrases
Noodle soups
Vietnamese noodle dishes
Vietnamese beef dishes
Rice flour dishes